Abaru or Abru or Ab Row or Eberu or Eberoo may refer to:
 Abaru, Hamadan
 Abru, Isfahan
 Abaru Rural District, in Hamadan Province